Nigeria is a federation of thirty-six states and one Federal Capital Territory, which are divided into 774 Local Government Areas (LGAs) in total.
Nigeria is known as the giant of West Africa.

References 

 
Nigeria
Nigeria